Encintados is a 2022 Peruvian-Argentine romantic comedy film directed by Gianfranco Quattrini and written by Quattrini and Mariana Silva. It stars Magdyel Ugaz, Ximena Palomino and Benjamín Amadeo. It premiered on May 26, 2022, in Peruvian theaters, and on September 10, 2022, in Argentine theaters.

Synopsis 
Martina wants to be a mother, but she does not have the financial resources for an insemination. With the support of her girlfriend, she decides to seduce an Argentine tourist into getting her pregnant. When the involuntary donor discovers the plan, he returns to Peru to assume his paternity... and to make Martina fall in love with him.

Cast 
The actors participating in this film are:

 Magdyel Ugaz as Sofía
 Ximena Palomino as Martina
 Benjamín Amadeo as Facundo
 Sergio Galliani as Julián
 Jely Reátegui as Arlette
 Katia Condos as Úrsula
 Candela Vetrano as Belén
 Victorio D'Alessandro as Ramiro
 Job Mansilla as Charly
 Luis Ramírez as Inti Gabriel
 Santiago Suárez as Yeison
 Gerardo Vázquez as Manuel
 Daniel Menacho as Diego
 Alessandra Ottazzi as Motta
 Joaquín Escobar as Gérman

Controversy 
When the first trailer was released, it received a barrage of criticism from users due to the poor representation of lesbian and bisexual people featured in the trailer. Through the film's official social networks, the director and one of the protagonists of the film, Magdyel Ugaz, publicly apologized and regretted the confusion.

References

External links 

 

2022 films
2022 romantic comedy films
2022 LGBT-related films
Peruvian romantic comedy films
Peruvian LGBT-related films
Argentine romantic comedy films
Argentine LGBT-related films
Lesbian-related films
2020s Peruvian films
2020s Argentine films
2020s Spanish-language films
Films about infidelity
Films about sperm donation
Films set in Peru
Films shot in Peru
LGBT-related romantic comedy films